"" is the 20th single by Zard released on February 26, 1997 via B-Gram Records. The single debuted at #2 rank first week. It charted for 11 weeks and sold over 636,000 copies.

Track list
All songs are written by Izumi Sakai.

composer: Tetsurō Oda/arrangement: Takeshi Hayama
the song was used in TBS drama Risou no Kekkon as theme song

composer and arrangement: Akihito Tokunaga
 (original karaoke) 
 (original karaoke)

References

1997 singles
Zard songs
1997 songs
Songs written by Izumi Sakai
Songs written by Tetsurō Oda